The Swanson Boathouse, also known as the Two Medicine Boathouse, was built in 1936 by concessioner Billy Swanson at Two Medicine Lake in Glacier National Park.  The rustic structure remains in its intended use. The boathouse was built by Captain J.W. "Billy" Swanson, who operated a launch on Two Medicine Lake.

See also 
 Lower Logging Lake Snowshoe Cabin and Boathouse: another boathouse on the NRHP in Glacier National Park

References

Buildings and structures completed in 1936
Rustic architecture in Montana
National Register of Historic Places in Glacier County, Montana
1936 establishments in Montana
National Register of Historic Places in Glacier National Park
Boathouses on the National Register of Historic Places
Transportation buildings and structures on the National Register of Historic Places in Montana